Sigarev or Sigaryov ( or Сигарёв) is a Russian masculine surname, its feminine counterpart is Sigareva or Sigaryova. It may refer to
Andrei Sigaryov (born 1993), Russian ice hockey player
Vassily Sigarev (born 1977), Russian playwright, screenwriter and film director     
Alexander Sigarev,Russian ex-Head of Novorossiysk-based Novbiznesbank                               

Russian-language surnames